Watching the Detectives may refer to:

 Watching the Detectives (film), a 2007 romantic comedy film written and directed by Paul Soter
 Watching the Detectives (song), a 1977 single by English singer-songwriter Elvis Costello
 Watching the Detectives (documentary TV series), a 5 part, 2003 crime documentary series on BBC One
 Watching the Detectives (Justified), the eighth episode of the third season of the American television series
 Watching the Detectives (strand), a strand of detective shows, between 2002 and 2005 on BBC Two
 Watching the Detectives (TV series), a 2005 British daytime game show on ITV